Shenk Peak is a 2,540 m high peak standing just southeast of Mount Kenyon between Gillespie Glacier and LaPrade Valley in the Cumulus Hills. It was named by the Texas Tech Shackleton Glacier Expedition (1964–65) for John C. Shenk, who was a Texas Tech graduate student and member of the expedition.

Mountains of the Ross Dependency
Dufek Coast